Mukuka Mulenga (born 6 July 1993) is a Zambian international footballer who plays for Power Dynamos in the Zambian MTN Super League, as a midfielder.

Career
Mulenga has played club football for Power Dynamos and Kabwe Warriors.

He made his international debut for Zambia in 2012. and was a participant at the 2013 Africa Cup of Nations.

References

1993 births
Living people
People from Kitwe
Zambian footballers
Association football midfielders
Zambia international footballers
Kabwe Warriors F.C. players
Power Dynamos F.C. players
Mamelodi Sundowns F.C. players
Bloemfontein Celtic F.C. players
Cape Town City F.C. (2016) players
2013 Africa Cup of Nations players
2015 Africa Cup of Nations players
Zambian expatriate footballers
Expatriate soccer players in South Africa
Zambian expatriate sportspeople in South Africa